Eliud Kipchoge  (born 5 November 1984) is a Kenyan long-distance runner who competes in the marathon and formerly specialized at the 5000 metre distance. Widely regarded as one of the greatest marathon runners of all time, he is the 2016 and 2020 Olympic marathon champion and the world record holder in the marathon with a time of 2:01:09 set at the 2022 Berlin Marathon. He has run four of the six fastest marathons in history.

Kipchoge claimed his first individual world championship title in 2003 by winning the junior race at the World Cross Country Championships and setting a world junior record over 5000 m on the track. At the age of eighteen, he became the senior 5000 m world champion at the 2003 World Championships with a championships record, then followed with an Olympic bronze for Kenya in 2004 and a bronze at the 2006 World Indoor Championships. A five-time World Championship 5000 m finalist, Kipchoge took silver medals at the 2007 World Championships, 2008 Beijing Olympics and 2010 Commonwealth Games.

He switched to road running in 2012 and made the second-fastest half marathon debut ever, at 59:25. In his marathon debut, he won the 2013 Hamburg Marathon in a course record time. His first victory at a World Marathon Major came at the Chicago Marathon in 2014, and he went on to become series champion a record five times – for 2016, 2017, 2018, 2019 and 2022. He has won the London Marathon a record four times and also shares the record for most Berlin Marathon wins with four, tied with Haile Gebrselassie. With 15 victories out of his 17 marathons, Kipchoge's only losses have been a second-place finish behind Wilson Kipsang Kiprotich at the 2013 Berlin Marathon, where Kipsang broke the world record, and an eighth-place finish at the 2020 London Marathon. Kipchoge's current world record run broke by 30 seconds his own 2018 world record, which was in turn a 78-second improvement over the existing best, the greatest improvement in a marathon world record time since 1967.

On 12 October 2019, Kipchoge ran the marathon distance for the Ineos 1:59 Challenge in Vienna, achieving a time of 1:59:40.2. The run did not count as a new marathon record, as standard competition rules for pacing and fluids were not followed, and it was not an open event.

Kipchoge was appointed Elder of the Order of the Golden Heart by President Uhuru Kenyatta in October 2019 in recognition of his sub-two-hour marathon. He was also named the 2019 BBC World Sport Star of the Year.

Personal life
Kipchoge was born on 5 November 1984 in Kapsisiywa, Nandi County, in Kenya. He graduated from the Kaptel Secondary School in Nandi County in 1999 but did not run seriously or as a profession then. He ran  to school on a daily basis. Kipchoge was raised by a single mother (a teacher), and only knew his father from pictures. He is the youngest of four children. He met his trainer Patrick Sang (a former Olympic medalist in the steeplechase) in 2001 at the age of 16.

Kipchoge's wife and three children live in Eldoret, Kenya. He lives and trains in Kaptagat, 30 km (19 miles) from Eldoret.

Career

2002–2004
In 2002, he won at the Kenyan trials for the 2002 IAAF World Cross Country Championships junior race. At the World Cross Country Championships, held in Dublin, Kipchoge finished fifth in the individual race and was part of the Kenyan junior team that won gold. Kipchoge also won the 5000 metres race at the Kenyan trial for the 2002 World Junior Championships in Athletics but fell ill and missed the championships. He won the junior race at the 2003 IAAF World Cross Country Championships.

He set a world junior record in the 5000 m at the 2003 Bislett Games, running a time of 12:52.61 minutes. This stood as the world and African junior record until 2012 when it was improved to 12:47.53 minutes by Hagos Gebrhiwet of Ethiopia.

Kipchoge won a gold medal at the 5000 m final at the 2003 World Championships in Paris, outsprinting runner-up Hicham El Guerrouj, the world record holder in the 1500 metres and mile, by four hundredths of a second in 12:52.79.

In July, he participated in the Golden League 2004 Roma Meeting. In the 5000 m event, he dipped first among the starters with 12:46.53, which made him the sixth-fastest ever in the event.

In 2004, Kipchoge won a bronze medal at the 5000 m final at the 2004 Athens Olympics, behind El Guerrouj and Kenenisa Bekele. He also won the Trofeo Alasport cross country race earlier that season.

2006
Kipchoge won the bronze in the 3000 metres indoor at the 2006 World Championships in Moscow.

At the end of the year, Kipchoge won the San Silvestre Vallecana New Year's Eve 10 km road race in a time of 26:54 minutes, which beat his own course record by 40 seconds. This time was also better than the 10K road world record at the time but was run on a downhill course.

2007
Kipchoge won a silver medal at the 5000 m final of the 2007 World Championships at Osaka in 13:46.00, behind Bernard Lagat (13:45.87).

2008
During the 2008 Olympics held in Beijing, China, Kipchoge won a silver medal in the 5000 m event with a time of 13:02.80; although better than the previous Olympic record of 13:05.59, it was not enough to match Kenenisa Bekele's pace, who won the gold medal for this race. On the circuit, he won the Great Yorkshire Run 10K and Campaccio Cross Country that year.

2009
He failed to reach the podium at the 2009 World Championships in Athletics, finishing in fifth place. He also finished ninth in the 3000 m at the 2009 IAAF World Athletics Final.

2010–2011
He made his debut on the 2010 IAAF Diamond League by winning the 5000 m Qatar Athletic Super Grand Prix in a meet record time.

Kipchoge then entered the Carlsbad 5000 in California, United States. The Carlsbad 5 km road race is the venue for the world's best times for a 5k road race for men and women, respectively. The fastest to cover the track was Sammy Kipketer in 2000, with 12:59.52 min. Kipchoge made a world best attempt, and although he won the race, weather affected his chances, and he finished in 13:11, the fourth-fastest ever for the course up to that point in time.

In the first athletics final of the 2010 Commonwealth Games, he attempted to win the 5000 m Commonwealth title. Ugandan runner Moses Kipsiro held a slender lead over him in the race's final stages, and Kipchoge ended up in second place, taking the silver medal some seven-hundredths of a second behind. He flew back to Europe immediately after to take part in the Belgrade Race through History the following day. His shoe fell off in the first kilometre, and, after putting it back on, he made up much ground on the field to eventually take second place two seconds behind Josphat Menjo.

At the start of 2011, he won the short race at the Great Edinburgh Cross Country, ahead of Asbel Kiprop. He attempted to retain his title at the Carlsbad 5000 in April but came a close second behind Dejen Gebremeskel. In May he raced the 3000 metres (finished third) in Doha, with a time of 7:27.66 and ranked him as the 12th-fastest at the distance up to this point. Kipchoge was chosen to represent Kenya at the 2011 World Championships in Athletics and reached the 5000 m final for the fifth consecutive time, although he only managed seventh place on this occasion.

2012
Kipchoge returned to the Edinburgh Cross Country in 2012, but this time he finished third behind Asbel Kiprop and Britain's Jonathan Hay. He was also third at the Carlsbad 5000 in March. He attempted to gain a place on the 10,000 m Olympic team at the Prefontaine Classic, but fell back in the late stages of the Kenyan trial race, finishing seventh. A seventh-place finish in the Kenyan 5000 m trial race meant he would not make a third consecutive Olympic team.

He made his half marathon debut in the Lille Half Marathon. The run was won by a new course record time of 59:05 (previously 59:36 by ilahun Regassa set in 2008) by Ezekiel Chebii (former pb 59:22), trailed by Bernard Koech 59:10, and Kipchoge earned a third place with 59:25. His time of 59:25 became the second fastest Half Marathon debut, only second to Moses Mosop's 59:20 in Milan in 2010.

On 6 October 2012, Kipchoge ran at the 2012 IAAF World Half Marathon Championships in Kavarna, Bulgaria. Zersenay Tadese of Eritrea won in 1:00:19 and Kipchoge placed sixth in 1:01:52.

2013
Kipchoge opened his 2013 season with a win at the Barcelona Half Marathon in a time of one hour and four seconds. Making his marathon debut in April, he demonstrated a smooth transition to the longer distance by taking the Hamburg Marathon title with a run of 2:05:30 hours, beating the field by over two minutes and setting a new course record. In August 2013, he won the Half Marathon of Klagenfurt in 1:01:02 minutes.

Then, he raced in the 2013 Berlin Marathon and finished second in 2:04:05, the fifth-fastest time in history, in his second-ever marathon, behind Wilson Kipsang, who set a new marathon world record with 2:03:23. Third place went to Geoffrey Kamworor of Kenya with 2:06:26. This was the ninth world record set at the Berlin Marathon.

2015

On 2 February, Kipchoge participated in the Ras al-Khaimah Half Marathon. He placed sixth with a time of 1:00:50. The run was won by Mosinet Geremew (Ethiopia) in 1:00:05. Kipchoge ran 2:04:42 to win the 2015 London Marathon in April. He also won the 2015 Berlin Marathon later in the year. His win and then-personal best time (2:04:00) occurred even though his shoes malfunctioned, causing his insoles to flap out of both shoes from 10 km onward; rather than risk time lost from an adjustment, he finished the race with bloodied, blistered feet.

2016
In April, Kipchoge won the 2016 London Marathon for the second consecutive year in a time of 2:03:05. His performance broke the course record in London and became the second-fastest marathon time in history, missing Dennis Kimetto's world record by 8 seconds.

Rio Olympic Games

As the prerace favourite, during the 2016 Rio Summer Olympics, Kipchoge gained a gold medal in the marathon event. On the last day of the Olympic Games on 21 August 2016, he won in a time of 2:08:44. The runner up was Feyisa Lilesa (Ethiopia) in 2:09:54 and the bronze medal went to Galen Rupp (USA), doing his second marathon, crossing the finish line in 2:10:05. When the halfway point after 21.0975 km was reached, 37 men were within 10 seconds of the lead runner. The participants' field diminished to 3 lead runners shortly before 34 km. Kipchoge made his final move on silver medal winner Lilesa around 36 km into the race. He covered the first half of the race in 1:05:55 while doing the second half in 1:02:49, which amounts to a difference of more than 3 minutes, a negative split. The winning gap between Kipchoge and Lilesa by 70 seconds was the largest victory margin since the 1972 Olympic marathon. Kipchoge's winning time of 2:08:44 was, as of August 2021, his slowest marathon time. One hundred fifty-five runners started the race, the largest field in Olympic history; 140 of them finished the race. With this win, Kipchoge became the second Kenyan male after Sammy Wanjiru in Beijing 2008 to win an Olympic marathon gold medal. At the same Olympics, the women's marathon was won by Jemima Sumgong, who became the first female Kenyan winner.

On 20 November 2016, Kipchoge ran in the Airtel Delhi Half Marathon, winning the race, clocking a time of 59:44.

2017

On 6 May, Kipchoge, along with Zersenay Tadese (then world record holder in the half marathon) and Lelisa Desisa (2-time Boston Marathon winner), attempted the first sub-two-hour assisted marathon in the Nike Breaking2 project on the Monza Formula 1 racetrack near Milan, Italy. All three runners ran a test 2 months before the attempt. The target time was 1 hour for a half Marathon. Kipchoge finished first in 59:17. The course was measured at 2400 m per lap. During the 2-hour attempt, the runners were paced by a lead car and 30 supporting pacers joining in stages (both considered illegal under IAAF rules). The race started at 5:45h local time on the 2.4 km track. Kipchoge finished in 2:00:25, while the other two had to slow and finished far behind. The runners planned even 14:13 5k splits to break 2 hours. His 5k splits were: 14:14, 14:07, 14:13, 14:15, 14:14, 14:17, 14:17, 14:27, and 6:20 to finish. The 5k split times from 25k and further would be world records: 25k in 1:11:03, 30k in 1:25:20, 35k in 1:39:37, 40k in 1:54:04.

On 24 September, he won the 2017 Berlin Marathon in a time of 2:03:32. In rainy conditions, he finished 14 seconds ahead of Guye Adola who ran his first marathon, and set the fastest marathon debut ever. Former marathon world record holder Wilson Kipsang and 2016 winner Kenenisa Bekele failed to finish.

2018
Kipchoge won the London Marathon against a field that included Mo Farah, Kenenisa Bekele, and defending champion Daniel Wanjiru.

2018 Berlin and new world record

On 16 September, Kipchoge won the 2018 Berlin Marathon in a time of 2:01:39, breaking the previous world record by 1 minute and 18 seconds (2:02:57 set by fellow countryman Dennis Kimetto at the Berlin Marathon in 2014). It was the greatest improvement in a marathon world record time since 1967. He finished 4:43 min ahead of second-placed fellow Kenyan Amos Kipruto. The world record holder from 2013, Wilson Kipsang of Kenya, came in third at 2:06:48. It was 11th world record set at the Berlin Marathon.

2018 accolades
Following his performances in the 2018 season, Kipchoge received numerous accolades and awards. He was named IAAF World Athlete of the Year together with Caterine Ibargüen, who received the female World Athlete of the Year award. On 11 January 2019, Kipchoge was named the 2018 Sportsman of the Year at the Kenyan Sports Personality of the Year Awards in Mombasa, Kenya.

2019
Kipchoge won the 2019 London Marathon in a time of 2:02:37, the second fastest marathon of all time, behind his 2018 Berlin Marathon win. He became the first man to win the event four times and set a new course record, beating his own 2016 London Marathon best by 28 seconds. The lead runner passed the half marathon mark in 1:01:37. Mosinet Geremew (Ethiopia) finished as the runner up in 2:02:55 and Mule Wasihun (Ethiopia) came in third place in 2:03:16. The British runner Mo Farah, a four-time Olympic gold medalist and a pre-race favourite, finished 5th.

Ineos 1:59 Challenge

In May 2019, a few days after his London Marathon win, Kipchoge announced another take on the sub-two-hour marathon, named the Ineos 1:59 Challenge. On 12 October 2019 in Vienna's Prater park, he ran 4.4 laps of the Hauptallee in 1:59:40, becoming the first person in recorded history to break the two-hour barrier over a marathon distance.

The effort did not count as a new world record under IAAF rules due to the setup of the challenge. Specifically, it was not an open event; Kipchoge was handed fluids by his support team throughout; the run featured a pace car and included rotating teams of other runners pacing Kipchoge in a formation designed to reduce wind resistance and maximise efficiency. The achievement was recognised by Guinness World Records with the titles 'Fastest marathon distance (male)' and 'First marathon distance run under two hours'.

2020
Kipchoge placed 8th in the 2020 London Marathon in October with a time of 2:06:49, the lowest finish of his marathoning career.

2021
In preparation for the delayed 2020 Tokyo Olympic Games, he won the NN Mission Marathon, which was held at Enschede Airport Twente in the Netherlands on 18 April 2021 in a time of 2:04:30. Jonathan Korir finished as the runner up with a personal best of 2:06:40.

Kipchoge successfully defended his title from the Rio Olympics by winning the gold medal in the men's marathon at the Tokyo Games in a time of 2:08:38, becoming only the third person to successfully defend their gold medal in the men's marathon, after Abebe Bikila in 1960 and 1964, and Waldemar Cierpinski in 1976 and 1980. He was the favourite to win and attacked around the 30 km mark, looking back only once afterwards. He won by 80 seconds, the largest margin in 49 years. The silver medal went to Abdi Nageeye (Netherlands), while Bashir Abdi (Belgium) came in third for a bronze medal with 2:10:00. Kipchoge was the oldest Olympic marathon winner since Carlos Lopes won in 1984 at the age of 37. The run was staged 500 miles north of Tokyo in Sapporo, with 106 runners participating. A documentary on the Ineos 1:59 Challenge, titled Kipchoge: The Last Milestone, was released digitally on-demand on 24 August 2021.

2022
On 20 January, Kipchoge announced his desire to win all 6 Abbott World Marathons Majors (he had already won 3, the London, Berlin, and Chicago marathons, by that time). This was followed up by an announcement on 18 February that he would be participating in the 2021 Tokyo Marathon (which would be held on 6 March 2022 due to COVID-19 restrictions in 2021) and that the majority of his recent training has been dedicated towards this goal. He won the Tokyo Marathon with a time of 2:02:40 – a course and all-comers' record. Amos Kipruto of Kenya finished second with a personal best of 2:03:13, and Tamirat Tola from Ethiopia came in third in a time of 2:04:14.

2022 Berlin and new world record

On 25 September, Kipchoge won the 2022 Berlin Marathon decisively in a time of 2:01:09, beating by 30 seconds his own previous world record, which he set on the same course in 2018. With his fourth victory in Berlin, he equalled the record achievement of Haile Gebrselassie. He finished 4:49 min ahead of second-placed compatriot Mark Korir while Ethiopia's Tadu Abate took third place with a time of 2:06:28. Kipchoge achieved halfway in 59:51 which, being at the time, the fastest split in marathon history, would have been a world record in the standalone half-marathon in 1993, and was only 26 seconds off his best in that distance. He slowed down later with second half in 61:18. It was the eighth time in a row that men's record was set in Berlin and 12th record there overall.

Competition record
Sources:

International

Marathons

* Not eligible for record purposes. Kipchoge was the fastest runner out of three.
** Not eligible for record purposes.

(*) Officially billed as the 2021 Tokyo Marathon, the race took place on 6 March 2022 after the 2021 edition was postponed because of the COVID-19 pandemic. As a consequence of this postponement, the 2022 Tokyo Marathon was cancelled.

(x) Cancelled due to the COVID-19 pandemic.

(p) Postponed due to the COVID-19 pandemic.

National titles
Kenyan Cross Country Championships
Senior race: 2004, 2005
Junior race: 2002, 2003
Kenyan Junior Championships
5000 m: 2002
Kenyan Olympic Trials
5000 m: 2004

Circuit wins

1500 m
FBK Games: 2004

3000 m
Qatar Athletic Super Grand Prix: 2004, 2005, 2007, 2009
Memorial Van Damme: 2004
British Grand Prix: 2006
BW-Bank-Meeting: 2006
Sparkassen Cup: 2006, 2010

Two miles
Prefontaine Classic: 2005
Birmingham Indoor Grand Prix: 2012

5000 m
Notturna di Milano: 2003, 2009
DN Galan: 2003
Golden Gala: 2004
Memorial Van Damme: 2005, 2008
Ostrava Golden Spike: 2008
Qatar Athletic Super Grand Prix: 2010

5K run
Carlsbad 5000: 2010

4 miles
4 Mile of Groningen: 2005, 2006, 2007

10K run
San Silvestre Vallecana: 2005, 2006
Great Yorkshire Run: 2009

Half marathon
Barcelona Half Marathon: 2013, 2014
Kärnten Läuft: 2013
Delhi Half Marathon: 2016

Cross country
Trofeo Alasport: 2004
Great Edinburgh International Cross Country: 2005, 2011
Campaccio: 2009

Personal bests
All information taken from World Athletics profile.

Awards
AIMS Best Marathon Runner Award – Men: 2015, 2016, 2017
2018 United Nations Kenya Person of the Year.
2018, 2019 IAAF Male athlete of the year award.
2019 BBC World Sport Star of the Year.
Kipchoge was cited as one of the Top 100 most influential Africans by New African magazine in 2019.
2021 Association of National Olympic Committees Best Male Athlete Tokyo 2020 Olympics.

See also

List of Olympic medalists in athletics (men)
List of World Championships in Athletics medalists (men)
List of Commonwealth Games medallists in athletics (men)
List of winners of the Chicago Marathon
List of winners of the London Marathon
List of winners of the Rotterdam Marathon
List of 2004 Summer Olympics medal winners
List of 2008 Summer Olympics medal winners
List of 2016 Summer Olympics medal winners
List of African Olympic medalists
List of middle-distance runners
5000 metres at the Olympics
Kenya at the World Championships in Athletics

References

External links

 

1984 births
Athletes (track and field) at the 2010 Commonwealth Games
Athletes (track and field) at the 2004 Summer Olympics
Athletes (track and field) at the 2008 Summer Olympics
Athletes (track and field) at the 2016 Summer Olympics
Athletes (track and field) at the 2020 Summer Olympics
BBC Sports Personality World Sport Star of the Year winners
Berlin Marathon male winners
Chicago Marathon male winners
Commonwealth Games medallists in athletics
Commonwealth Games silver medallists for Kenya
Elders of the Order of the Golden Heart of Kenya
Kalenjin people
Kenyan male cross country runners
Kenyan male long-distance runners
Kenyan male marathon runners
Kenyan male middle-distance runners
Living people
London Marathon male winners
Medalists at the 2004 Summer Olympics
Medalists at the 2008 Summer Olympics
Medalists at the 2016 Summer Olympics
Medalists at the 2020 Summer Olympics
Olympic athletes of Kenya
Olympic bronze medalists for Kenya
Olympic bronze medalists in athletics (track and field)
Olympic gold medalists for Kenya
Olympic gold medalists in athletics (track and field)
Olympic male long-distance runners
Olympic male marathon runners
Olympic silver medalists for Kenya
Olympic silver medalists in athletics (track and field)
People from Nandi County
Recipients of the Association of International Marathons and Distance Races Best Marathon Runner Award
Tokyo Marathon male winners
Track & Field News Athlete of the Year winners
World Athletics Championships athletes for Kenya
World Athletics Championships medalists
World Athletics Championships winners
World Athletics record holders
Medallists at the 2010 Commonwealth Games